The surname Witcher may refer to:

 Al Witcher (born 1936), American football player
 Bobby Witcher, American herpetologist
 Dick Witcher former professional American football player
 Gabe Witcher (born 1978), American multi-instrumentalist, producer, and arranger best known as a fiddle player and singer, He is a founding member of the string ensemble Punch Brothers
 John Seashoal Witcher (1839–1906), American Union brevet brigadier general 
 Robert C. Witcher, sixth bishop of the Episcopal Diocese of Long Island
 Ronald K. Witcher, owner of KCYL, a Texas radio station
 Vincent A. Witcher, namesake of Witcher's Battalion, American Civil War
 Witcher (Hampshire cricketer), English cricketer who played a single game for Hampshire county cricket teams; no bio info available

See also
Wicher (disambiguation) for some other spelling variants